This article lists the results for the Scotland national football team between 2000 and 2019.

Key

Key to matches
Att. = Match attendance
(H) = Home ground
(A) = Away ground
(N) = Neutral ground

Key to record by opponent
Pld = Games played
W = Games won
D = Games drawn
L = Games lost
GF = Goals for
GA = Goals against

Results
Scotland's score is shown first in each case.

Record by opponent

Statistics include official FIFA recognised matches, and also includes a match against a Hong Kong League XI played on 23 May 2002 that the Scottish Football Association includes in its statistical totals.

Notes

References

External links
RSSSF: Scotland – International Results
Scotland – International Results
Scottish Football Association: History Archives

2000
1999–2000 in Scottish football
2000–01 in Scottish football
2001–02 in Scottish football
2002–03 in Scottish football
2003–04 in Scottish football
2004–05 in Scottish football
2005–06 in Scottish football
2006–07 in Scottish football
2007–08 in Scottish football
2008–09 in Scottish football
2009–10 in Scottish football
2010–11 in Scottish football
2011–12 in Scottish football
2012–13 in Scottish football
2013–14 in Scottish football
2014–15 in Scottish football
2015–16 in Scottish football
2016–17 in Scottish football
2017–18 in Scottish football
2018–19 in Scottish football
2019–20 in Scottish football